Centrovarioplana tenuis is a species of Maricola triclad that is found in Antarctica. It is the only species known in the monotypic genus Centrovarioplana and the family Centrovarioplananidae.

References

Animals described in 1952
Maricola
Monotypic protostome genera